Washington Island Stavkirke is a stave church located in Washington Island, Wisconsin. It is owned and operated by Trinity Evangelical Lutheran Church and is positioned a few hundred yards away from it.

The construction 
The volunteer-led construction of the church began in 1983 and was modeled after the Borgund Stave Church in Borgund, Lærdal, Norway, which was built in 1150. It was created to reflect the Scandinavian heritage of Washington Island and was originally proposed by James Reiff, who was the acting pastor of Trinity Evangelical Lutheran church from 1978–1985. The building has twelve 18-foot masts all harvested locally from the island. Eleven of the masts are pine and one is white fir. 9,600 four-inch wide shingles make up the six-tiered roof of the Stavkirke. The church was completed and dedicated in the summer of 1995.

Its use 
Around 8,000–10,000 people visit the Stavkirke annually. During the summer, a weekly Wednesday service is held in the building. Baptisms and wedding ceremonies are also held in the building.

References

Further reading 
 Purinton, Richard (2017). Island Stavkirke Island Bayou Press .

Stave churches
Churches in Door County, Wisconsin
Evangelical Lutheran Church in America
Buildings and structures completed in 1995
Norwegian-American culture in Wisconsin